Brian Michael Ellington (born August 4, 1990) is an American professional baseball pitcher who is a free agent. He has previously played in Major League Baseball (MLB) for the Miami Marlins.

Career

Amateur career
Ellington attended Oak Hall School in Gainesville, Florida. He had committed to attend Florida State University on a scholarship to play college baseball for the Florida State Seminoles. He underwent Tommy John surgery in September 2007, and decommitted from Florida State due to differences of opinion on how he should rehabilitate his arm after the surgery. He enrolled at Chipola College and transferred to Florida State College at Jacksonville, before finishing his collegiate career at the University of West Florida.

Miami Marlins
The Miami Marlins selected Ellington in the 16th round of the 2012 MLB draft. Ellington played for the Jupiter Hammerheads of the Class A-Advanced Florida State League in 2014. After the regular season, he was assigned to the Salt River Rafters Arizona Fall League (AFL), and appeared in the AFL Fall Stars Game.

In 2015, Ellington played for the Jacksonville Suns of the Double-A Southern League. The Marlins promoted Ellington to the major leagues on August 3, 2015. He made his major league debut that night. During the 2015 through 2017 seasons, Ellington appeared in 97 games with Miami, pitching to a record of 7–4 with a 4.65 earned run average (ERA) and 98 strikeouts in  innings pitched. Ellington was designated for assignment on April 1, 2018. He was released by the Marlins on April 6.

Arizona Diamondbacks
On April 20, 2018, Ellington signed a minor league deal with the Arizona Diamondbacks. After appearing in 15 minor league games, he was released on July 28, 2018. He became a free agent after the 2018 season.

Boston Red Sox
On February 1, 2019, Ellington signed a minor league contract with the Boston Red Sox. He began the seasons with the Double-A Portland Sea Dogs, and was promoted to the Triple-A Pawtucket Red Sox in early June. He was released on June 26, 2019.

Kansas City T-Bones
On July 3, 2019, Ellington signed with the Kansas City T-Bones of the American Association of Independent Professional Baseball.

Seattle Mariners
On July 31, 2019, Ellington's contract was purchased by the Seattle Mariners. He became a free agent following the 2019 season. He became a free agent after the 2019 season.

Kansas City Monarchs
On December 2, 2020, Ellington re-signed with the Kansas City T-Bones, who were later re-branded as the Kansas City Monarchs, of the American Association of Professional Baseball. In 27 bullpen appearances, Ellington posted a 3–4 record with a 4.33 ERA and 41 strikeouts.

Sioux City Explorers
On July 31, 2021, Ellington was claimed off waivers by the Sioux City Explorers of the American Association of Professional Baseball. On March 31, 2022, Ellington was released by the Explorers.

International career
Ellington was chosen to play for the United States national baseball team in the 2015 Pan American Games.

References

External links

1990 births
Living people
Arizona League Diamondbacks players
Baseball players at the 2015 Pan American Games
Baseball players from Gainesville, Florida
Batavia Muckdogs players
Chipola Indians baseball players
Florida State College at Jacksonville alumni
Greensboro Grasshoppers players
Gulf Coast Marlins players
Hillsboro Hops players
Jackson Generals (Southern League) players
Jacksonville Suns players
Jamestown Jammers players
Jupiter Hammerheads players
Kansas City T-Bones players
Major League Baseball pitchers
Miami Marlins players
Naranjeros de Hermosillo players
American expatriate baseball players in Mexico
New Orleans Baby Cakes players
New Orleans Zephyrs players
Pan American Games medalists in baseball
Pan American Games silver medalists for the United States
Pawtucket Red Sox players
Portland Sea Dogs players
Salt River Rafters players
Tacoma Rainiers players
United States national baseball team players
West Florida Argonauts baseball players
Medalists at the 2015 Pan American Games